The following elections occurred in the year 1902.

 1902 Brazilian presidential election
 1902 Danish Landsting election
 1902 French legislative election

Europe

United Kingdom
 1902 Bury by-election
 1902 Cleveland by-election
 1902 Leeds North by-election

North America

Canada
 1902 Edmonton municipal election
 1902 Northwest Territories general election
 1902 Ontario general election
 1902 Ontario prohibition referendum

United States
 United States House of Representatives elections in California, 1902
 1902 United States House of Representatives elections
 1902 New York state election
 United States House of Representatives elections in South Carolina, 1902
 United States Senate election in South Carolina, 1902
 1902 South Carolina gubernatorial election
 1902 United States Senate elections

Oceania

Australia
 1902 South Australian state election
 1902 Tasmania by-election

New Zealand
 1902 New Zealand general election

See also
 :Category:1902 elections

1902
Elections